The 1987 Sugar Bowl was the 53rd edition of the college football bowl game, played at the Louisiana Superdome in New Orleans, Louisiana, on Thursday, January 1. Part of the 1986–87 bowl game season, it featured the fifth-ranked LSU Tigers of the Southeastern Conference (SEC) and #6 Nebraska Cornhuskers of the Big Eight Conference. Favored Nebraska trailed early and won, 30–15.

It was the third time in five seasons that the teams had met in a major bowl game   and Nebraska won all three.

Teams

Nebraska

LSU

Game summary
Both televised by ABC, the game followed the Florida Citrus Bowl and kicked off shortly after 2:30 p.m. CST, two hours after the Cotton Bowl started on CBS, and ninety minutes before the Rose Bowl on NBC.

LSU chose to wear white jerseys as the designated home team, despite an NCAA rule passed in 1983 which required the visiting team to wear white jerseys. LSU traditionally wore white at home from 1958–82, and has done so again since 1995, when the NCAA partially revoked the 1983 rule, allowing home teams to wear white with consent of the visitors. In 1997, the SEC ruled home teams would have jersey color choice without consent of the visitors for conference games.

On the first play from scrimmage, underdog LSU gained 43 yards on a pass to Wendell Davis from freshman quarterback  the Tigers scored six plays later on a one-yard touchdown run from  In the second quarter,  kicked a 42-yard field goal for the Huskers and quarterback  scored on a two-yard run to give Nebraska  lead 

Early in the second half, fullback  scored from a yard out and Nebraska led  after three quarters.

Nebraska's Taylor was named the game's most valuable  the Huskers climbed to fifth in the final AP poll and LSU fell 

After the game, Tom Osborne said "We weren't playing for the national championship, the Big Eight Championship was out the window. The only thing we had left was the Sugar Bowl."

Scoring
First quarter
LSU – Harvey Williams 1 run (David Browndyke kick)

Second quarter
Nebraska – Field goal, Dale Klein 42
Nebraska – Steve Taylor 2 run (Klein kick)

Third quarter
Nebraska – Tyreese Knox 1 run (Klein kick)

Fourth quarter
Nebraska – Todd Millikan 3 pass from Taylor (Klein kick)
Nebraska – Knox 1 run (kick failed)
LSU – Tony Moss 24 pass from Tommy Hodson (Alvin Lee pass from Hodson)

Statistics
{| class=wikitable style="text-align:center"
! Statistics !!  Nebraska  !! LSU
|-
|align=left|First Downs || 22 || 10
|-
|align=left|Rushes–yards|| 60–242|| 29–32
|-
|align=left|Passing yards || 110 || 159
|-
|align=left|Passes || 11–20–0 || 14–30–2
|-
|align=left|Total Offense || 80–352 || 59–191
|-
|align=left|Punts–average ||4–30.5|| 6–42.0
|-
|align=left|Fumbles–lost ||5–2|| 6–1
|-
|align=left|Turnovers||2||3
|-
|align=left|Penalties–yards ||5–78|| 12–130
|-
|align=left|Time of possession ||39:13||20:47
|}

Aftermath
The victory improved Nebraska to 5–0–1 all-time vs. LSU. The Cornhuskers defeated the Tigers 17–12 in the 1971 Orange Bowl (to secure the national title) and 10–7 in the 1975 season opener at Lincoln. They played to a 6–6 tie at Baton Rouge to open the 1976 season and Nebraska defeated the LSU Tigers in the 1983 Orange Bowl 21-20.

This was the final game for LSU under head coach Bill Arnsparger; he had accepted the athletic director position at conference rival Florida, announced immediately after the Tigers' regular season finale with Tulane on  Arnsparger led LSU to the SEC championship this season, its first since 1970, but his minimal recruiting skills and  bowl record (two of those losses to the Cornhuskers) left many LSU fans in disfavor of him. Arnsparger departed with a  record and recommended his 33-year-old defensive coordinator Mike Archer as his successor.

Archer coached the next four seasons at LSU with a  record, but Arnsparger's lack of recruiting put him in a hole. Arnsparger's best players, such as NT Henry Thomas, OG Eric Andolsek, C Nacho Albergamo, and FS Chris Carrier, were all recruited by the previous head coach, Jerry Stovall. LSU played in bowls in the following two seasons, but then suffered through six consecutive losing seasons from 1989-84, the first two under Archer and the next four under Curley Hallman. LSU's next bowl game was the 1995 Independence Bowl under Gerry DiNardo.

LSU did not return to the Sugar Bowl (or any major bowl) until it won the SEC championship in 2001 under second-year coach Nick Saban. The Tigers then rolled over Illinois 47-34 in the 2002 Sugar Bowl behind Rohan Davey's 444 yards passing.

Nebraska continued its winning football under Tom Osborne with national championships in 1994 and 1995. They tied for another in 1997 and played for another in 2001 under Frank Solich.

The Cornhuskers have not played in the Sugar Bowl since this game. They are 3-1 in the Sugar Bowl, previously losing to Alabama in 1967 and defeating Florida in 1974, in addition to the victory over LSU in 1985.

References

Sugar Bowl
Sugar Bowl
LSU Tigers football bowl games
Nebraska Cornhuskers football bowl games
Sugar Bowl
Sugar Bowl